Zanaetchiski Dom is a building in Kumanovo, North Macedonia.

Reconstruction
Last reconstruction was in 1983.

Interior reconstruction of the Main Hall was completed on 30 December 2016. The cost was 18 Million MKD and it was provided by Centre for Development of the Northeast Region and Kumanovo Municipality. Previously the Main Hall was the "Cinema Napredok" that stopped working in the mid 1990s The Hall was out of function until 2016 reconstruction.

See also
 Buildings in Kumanovo

External links
 Gallery of the Interior

References

Buildings and structures in Kumanovo